1984 Soviet Second League was a Soviet competition in the Soviet Second League.

Qualifying groups

Group I [Russian Federation]

Group II [Russian Federation]

Group III [Russian Federation]

Group IV [Russian Federation]

Group V (Soviet Republics)

Group VI [Ukraine]

 For places 1-12

Group VII (Central Asia)

Group VIII [Kazakhstan]

Group IX (Caucasus)

Final group stage
 [Oct 21 – Nov 8]

Group A

Group B

Group C

References
 All-Soviet Archive Site
 Results. RSSSF

Soviet Second League seasons
3
Soviet
Soviet